Trnovska mafija drugič is a novel by Slovenian author Dim Zupan. It is the sequel to Zupan's 1992 novel, Trnovska mafija. It was first published in 1997.

See also
List of Slovenian novels

References
Trnovska mafija drugič, Bolha.com, accessed 19 July 2012

Slovenian novels
1997 novels